Jocara francesca is a species of snout moth in the genus Jocara. The species was first described by E. Dukinfield Jones in 1912. It is found in French Guiana and Brazil.

References

Moths described in 1912
Jocara